Robert M. Johnson is an American politician. He served as a Republican member for the 74th and 118th district of the Florida House of Representatives.

In 1970, Johnson won the election for the 118th district of the Florida House of Representatives. He succeeded Donald E. Heath. In 1972, Johnson was succeeded by Dick Clark for the 118th district. In the same year, he won the election for the 74th district for which Johnson had succeeded William E. Powell. He was then succeeded by Ted Ewing for the 74th district in 1976.

References 

Living people
Place of birth missing (living people)
Year of birth missing (living people)
Republican Party members of the Florida House of Representatives
20th-century American politicians